Clemente Gordon (born August 14, 1967) is a former American football quarterback who played eight seasons in the Arena Football League with the Cincinnati Rockers, Miami Hooters, Connecticut Coyotes, Charlotte Rage and Florida Bobcats. He was drafted by the Cleveland Browns in the 11th round of the 1990 NFL Draft. He played college football at Grambling State University. Gordon was also a member of the Orlando Thunder of the World League of American Football. He was drafted by Chicago White Sox in the 51st round of the 1990 MLB June Amateur Draft.

References

External links
Just Sports Stats

Living people
1967 births
American football quarterbacks
African-American players of American football
Grambling State Tigers football players
Orlando Thunder players
Cincinnati Rockers players
Miami Hooters players
Connecticut Coyotes players
Charlotte Rage players
Florida Bobcats players
Players of American football from Atlanta
21st-century African-American people
20th-century African-American sportspeople